Lieutenant General is a three-star army officer rank in the Pakistan Army. It is equivalent to a vice admiral in the Pakistan Navy and an air marshal in the Pakistan Air Force.  A lieutenant general is also called a three-star general. Like other armies, this rank is higher than a major general and lower than a full general. There are currently 27 Lieutenant Generals in the Pakistan Army, with each usually presiding over a corps.

The Pakistan Army has followed the British Army rank system since its independence from the British Empire in 1947. However, the crown in the ranks has been replaced with a star and crescent, which symbolizes the sovereignty of the Government of Pakistan.

List of current Lieutenant Generals

List of designated and active Lieutenant Generals in the Medical Corps

References

Pakistan Army ranks
Pakistan Army
 Pakistan